Anton Bardok (born 23 June 1986) is a Belarusian former professional footballer.

External links

1986 births
Living people
Belarusian footballers
Association football forwards
FC RUOR Minsk players
FC Dinamo Minsk players
FC Partizan Minsk players
FC Naftan Novopolotsk players
FC Savit Mogilev players
FC Dnepr Mogilev players
FC Slavia Mozyr players
FC Gorodeya players
FC SKVICH Minsk players
FC Spartak Shklov players